Leandro Agustín Zazpe Rodríguez (born 29 April, 1994) is a Uruguayan professional footballer who plays as a left back for Deportes Valdivia.

Career
Zazpe's first club were Fénix. He made his professional debut in November 2013 during a 2–1 loss to Peñarol. Fourteen appearances later, Zazpe scored his first senior goal in a win vs. Racing Club on 29 August 2015. In July 2016, Zazpe joined Juventud. During 2016 and 2017, he made thirty-two appearances and scored four goals before being loaned to Argentine Primera División side Defensa y Justicia. He returned at the end of 2017 after no appearances for Defensa, appearing on the bench just once in September against Estudiantes. Whilst in Argentina, Juventud were relegated to tier two.

In January 2018, Zazpe signed for Uruguayan Primera División team Cerro on loan. He scored on his debut for Cerro, in a draw with Liverpool on February 4, 2018. A move to Racing Club was completed on 8 January 2019.

Career statistics
.

References

External links

1994 births
Living people
People from Canelones Department
Uruguayan footballers
Association football defenders
Uruguayan expatriate footballers
Expatriate footballers in Argentina
Expatriate footballers in Chile
Uruguayan expatriate sportspeople in Argentina
Uruguayan expatriate sportspeople in Chile
Uruguayan Primera División players
Uruguayan Segunda División players
Argentine Primera División players
Primera B de Chile players
Centro Atlético Fénix players
Juventud de Las Piedras players
Defensa y Justicia footballers
C.A. Cerro players
Racing Club de Montevideo players
Deportes Valdivia footballers